Oestophorella is a monotypic genus of gastropods belonging to the family Trissexodontidae. The only species is Oestophorella buvinieri.

The species is found in Pyrenees.

References

Trissexodontidae